Monttea is a genus of flowering plants belonging to the family Plantaginaceae.

Its native range is southern South America and is found in Argentina and Chile.

The genus name of Monttea is in honour of Manuel Montt (1809–1880), a Chilean statesman and scholar. He was twice elected President of Chile between 1851 and 1861. It was first described and published in Fl. Chil. Vol.4 on page 416 in 1849.

Known species
According to Kew:
Monttea aphylla 
Monttea chilensis 
Monttea schickendantzii

References

Plantaginaceae
Plantaginaceae genera
Plants described in 1849
Flora of Argentina
Flora of Chile